The Devil Dared Me To is a New Zealand film written by and starring Chris Stapp and Matt Heath. The film revolves around a fictional stuntman, Randy Cambell, who aspires to be the greatest living New Zealander in that profession. The character was first developed as the stuntman in Stapp and Heath's Back of the Y Masterpiece Television.

Stapp told the New Zealand Listener: "Our aim is to make the greatest New Zealand film since Goodbye Pork Pie".''

The film was released in theaters across New Zealand on 11 October 2007. The film grossed $93,950 after four days on 35 screens to rank sixth on the week's box office top 20; after seven days, it had earned $127,320, and earned another $52,000 over Labour Weekend.

NZFC support
In May 2006 Devil Limited Ltd received a total of $859,314 from the New Zealand Film Commission to produce the film. This included full blow-up from HD acquisition and sound-post to digital-dolby 35mm in support the films NZ multi-plex release strategy.

Release
'The Devil Dared Me To' had its world premiere at SXSW and screened at over 20 International Film Festivals. It has sold to Wild Bunch for the United Kingdom, Vivendi for the United States and Boll AG for rest of world.

'The Devil Dared Me To' is rated R16 in New Zealand for sex scenes, violence, drug use and offensive language.

Cast
Chris Stapp as Randy Cambell
Matt Heath as Dick Johansonson
Bonnie Soper as Tracy 'Tragedy' Jones
Andrew Beattie as Spanner's Dad
Phil Brough as Spanners Watson
Ria Vandervis as Cindy Cockburn
Dominic Bowden as Sheldon Snake
Zach Baker as Kid Randy
Nicholas Houltham as Kid Spanners
Floyd Alexander-Hunt as Kid Tracy
Ross Harper as Uncle Norm

References

External links
 

New Zealand comedy films
2007 films
2007 comedy films
Films about stunt performers
2000s English-language films